The Girl Without a Soul is a 1917 American silent feature film featuring Viola Dana in a dual role as sisters.

The film was produced by B.A. Rolfe and shot in the Fort Lee, New Jersey area.  Rolfe moved his production company west to Hollywood in the wake of the 1918 influenza epidemic, but not before director Collins fell victim and died in a New York hotel room in October of that year.

This film is preserved complete at the George Eastman House Motion Picture Collection in New York. In 2018, the film was selected for preservation in the United States National Film Registry by the Library of Congress as being "culturally, historically, or aesthetically significant."

Plot
As described in a film magazine, Priscilla and Unity Beaumont (Dana) are as different as night and day. Priscilla longs for a career on the concert stage, while Unity is the family drudge. Ivor (Jones), a Russian violinist, persuades Priscilla to steal some money from the village blacksmith Hiram Miller (Walker), which he was holding in trust to purchase a new church organ. Unity, who is in love with Hiram, learns of the location of the money and restores it to the church during the trial of Hiram. Hiram is freed of the charge, and Priscilla learns that Ivor is but a deceiver.

Cast
 Viola Dana as Unity Beaumont / Priscilla Beaumont
 Robert D. Walker as Hiram Miller
 Fred C. Jones as Ivor
 Henry Hallam as Dominic Beaumont
 Margaret Seddon as Henrietta Hateman
 Margaret Vaughan as Louise

Reception
Like many American films of the time, The Girl Without a Soul was subject to cuts by city and state film censorship boards. The Chicago Board of Censors cut a scene with money being taken from a tin box, the intertitle "You had better remain here and go away tomorrow," and a vision of the girl taking money from the tin box.

References

External links
  
 Turner Classic Movies page

1917 films
American silent feature films
1917 drama films
Silent American drama films
American black-and-white films
United States National Film Registry films
Surviving American silent films
Films directed by John H. Collins
Films produced by B. A. Rolfe
1910s American films